Atascadero Creek may refer to:

 Atascadero Creek (Santa Barbara County, California) a stream in Santa Barbara County, California
 Atascadero Creek (Sonoma County, California) a stream in Sonoma County, California